Rest on the Flight into Egypt is a  1604 oil on canvas painting by Annibale Carracci.

It probably originally formed part of Jaccques Stella's collection, which was brought from Italy to Paris. In 1672 it was recorded in abbot Deno de La Nu's collection and it probably also belonged to the La Mera family, whose coat of arms is superimposed over that of Francois de Poigli on the back of the work. It was acquired in 1772 by Pierre Crozat and later by Catherine the Great, thus arriving at its present home in the Hermitage Museum. It is displayed in room 231 (Italy) in the New Hermitage Palace.

Copies
An anonymous 17th century rectangular copy is recorded in the Orleans Collection before being acquired by the Duke of Sutherland and finally ending up in Princeton University Art Museum. An early round copy is now in the Kunsthalle in Berne, whilst another rectangular copy was auctioned at Christie's on 31 July 1956. Another round copy is in a private U.S. collection.

References

Crozat collection
Carracci
Paintings in the collection of the Hermitage Museum
Paintings by Annibale Carracci
1604 paintings
Donkeys in art